Wayne Black and Kevin Ullyett were the defending champions but lost in the first round to Arnaud Clément and Sébastien Grosjean.

Jonathan Erlich and Andy Ram won in the final 6–1, 6–3 against Julien Benneteau and Nicolas Mahut.

Seeds

  Mark Knowles /  Daniel Nestor (first round)
  Michaël Llodra /  Fabrice Santoro (semifinals)
  Gastón Etlis /  Martín Rodríguez (quarterfinals)
  Wayne Black /  Kevin Ullyett (first round)

Draw

External links
 Grand Prix de Tennis de Lyon Doubles Draw

Doubles
Doubles